Buffalo River may refer to:

Australia
Buffalo River (Victoria)

Canada
 Buffalo River (Alberta), tributary of the Peace River

South Africa
 Buffalo River (Eastern Cape)
 Buffalo River (KwaZulu-Natal)
 Buffalo River (Groot River), Southern Cape

United States
 Buffalo National River, Arkansas
 Buffalo River (Georgia)
 Buffalo River (Minnesota)
 Buffalo River (New York)
 Buffalo River (Tennessee)
 Buffalo Bayou in Houston, Texas
 Buffalo River (Virginia)
 Buffalo River (Wisconsin)

See also 
 Buffalo Creek (disambiguation)
 Buffalo River State Park (disambiguation)